Tadas Mincė (born 31 July 1993) also known as Mincė is a Lithuanian professional basketball player who plays as a shooting guard for Lietkabelis-2 in NKL.

References

1993 births
Living people
Lithuanian men's basketball players
Shooting guards